Oak Bay is a Canadian rural community in Charlotte County, New Brunswick.

Oak Bay generally refers to the residential areas surrounding the head of Passamaquoddy Bay which is known as Oak Bay.

History

Notable people

See also
List of communities in New Brunswick

References

Communities in Charlotte County, New Brunswick